Variibacter gotjawalensis is a Gram-negative and non-motile bacteria from the genus Variibacter which has been isolated from soil from the Gotjawal forest on Korea.

References

Bacteria described in 2014